Kleven may refer to:

Jay Kleven, an American baseball player
Elisa Kleven, an American children's writer
Endre Johannes Cleven, also spelled Kleven in Norwegian, Norwegian-born Canadian
Kleven, a historic and German name for Chiavenna (SO), a town in Lombardy, Italy
The Norwegian surname, also spelled Cleven